Banning General Hospital, later the Naval Convalescent Hospital, Banning, was a military hospital in Banning, California, built in 1943 to support training at the Desert Training Center. Built by the army as a 1,000-bed hospital, it was transferred to the navy in 1944. In 1948 the site was declared surplus, all buildings were removed, and the leased land was returned to the original owners.

History
It was a military hospital used from 1943 to 1944.

See also
Camp Coxcomb 
Camp Granite 
Camp Iron Mountain
Camp Ibis
California during World War II

References
 "Banning General Hospital (Naval Convalescent Hospital, Banning)". The California State Military Museum, 2008
 Matt Bishoff (California State Historian III). Campsites Desert Training Center Sky Trail, 2012

Hospital buildings completed in 1943
1943 establishments in California
1948 disestablishments in California
Hospitals of the United States Army
Medical installations of the United States Navy
Military in Riverside County, California
World War II sites in the United States
Closed installations of the United States Army
Military installations closed in 1948
Hospitals in Riverside County, California
Banning, California
History of Riverside County, California